The Colorado Rockies' 2006 season was the 14th for the Rockies. They competed in the National League West finishing with a record of 76–86 and tied for 4th place in the division. Clint Hurdle was the manager. They played home games at Coors Field.

Offseason
December 7, 2005: Yorvit Torrealba was traded by the Seattle Mariners to the Colorado Rockies for Marcos Carvajal.
December 7, 2005: Aaron Miles was traded by the Colorado Rockies with Larry Bigbie to the St. Louis Cardinals for Ray King.
December 19, 2005: José Mesa was signed as a free agent by the Colorado Rockies.
January 7, 2006: Eli Marrero was signed as a free agent by the Colorado Rockies.
February 10, 2006: Josh Fogg was signed as a free agent by the Colorado Rockies.
February 11, 2006: Jamey Carroll was purchased by the Colorado Rockies from the Washington Nationals.

Regular season

Season standings

National League West

Record vs. opponents

Transactions
June 9, 2006: Eli Marrero was traded by the Colorado Rockies to the New York Mets for Kazuo Matsui and cash.
July 31, 2006: Scott Dohmann and Ryan Shealy were traded by the Colorado Rockies to the Kansas City Royals for Jeremy Affeldt and Denny Bautista.
August 14, 2006: Vinny Castilla was signed as a free agent by the Colorado Rockies.

Major League debuts
Batters:
Chris Iannetta (Aug 27)
Troy Tulowitzki (Aug 30)
Jeff Salazar (Sep 7)
Alvin Colina (Sep 18)
Pitchers:
Ramón Ramírez (Apr 14)
Manuel Corpas (Jul 18)
Justin Hampson (Sep 10)
Juan Morillo (Sep 24)
Ubaldo Jiménez (Sep 26)

Roster

Game log 

|-  style="background:#bfb;"
| 1 || April 3 || Diamondbacks || 3–2  || DeJean (1–0) || Grimsley (0–1) || || 47,278 || 1–0
|-  style="background:#fbb;"
| 2 || April 5 || Diamondbacks || 4–2 || Hernández (1–0) || Cook (0–1) || Valverde (1) || 18,553 || 1–1
|-  style="background:#fbb;"
| 3 || April 6 || Diamondbacks || 12–5 || Batista (1–0) || Francis (0–1) || || 18,406 || 1–2
|-  style="background:#bfb;"
| 4 || April 7 || @ Padres || 10–4 || Fogg (1–0) || Hensley (0–1) || || 33,918 || 2–2
|-  style="background:#bfb;"
| 5 || April 8 || @ Padres || 12–4 || Day (1–0) || Brazelton (0–1) || || 29,629 || 3–2
|-  style="background:#bfb;"
| 6 || April 9 || @ Padres || 10–4 || Jennings (1–0) || Peavy (1–1) || || 28,901 || 4–2
|-  style="background:#bfb;"
| 7 || April 11 || @ Diamondbacks || 6–5 || Cook (1–1) || Hernández (1–1) || Fuentes (1) || 37,355 || 5–2
|-  style="background:#fbb;"
| 8 || April 12 || @ Diamondbacks || 5–4 || Aquino (1–0) || King (0–1) || Valverde (2) || 18,664 || 5–3
|-  style="background:#bfb;"
| 9 || April 13 || @ Diamondbacks || 5–3 || Fogg (2–0) || Ortiz (0–2) || Fuentes (2) || 18,745 || 6–3
|-  style="background:#fbb;"
| 10 || April 14 || Phillies || 10–8 || Madson (1–0) || Day (1–1) || Gordon (3) || 25,390 || 6–4
|-  style="background:#bfb;"
| 11 || April 15 || Phillies || 10–6 || King (1–1) || Lieber (0–3) || || 23,206 || 7–4
|-  style="background:#fbb;"
| 12 || April 16 || Phillies || 1–0 || Myers (1–0) || Cook (1–2) || Gordon (4) || 25,144 || 7–5
|-  style="background:#fbb;"
| 13 || April 17 || Padres || 5–2 || Young (2–0) || Francis (0–2) || Hoffman (2) || 18,591 || 7–6
|-  style="background:#bfb;"
| 14 || April 18 || Padres || 3–2  || Cortés (1–0) || Adkins (0–1) || || 18,595 || 8–6
|-  style="background:#fbb;"
| 15 || April 19 || Padres || 13–4 || Park (1–0) || Day (1–2) || || 18,827 || 8–7
|-  style="background:#bfb;"
| 16 || April 21 || Giants || 9–8 || Cortés (2–0) || Worrell (2–1) || || 30,339 || 9–7
|-  style="background:#fbb;"
| 17 || April 22 || Giants || 6–4 || Hennessey (2–0) || Cook (1–3) || Benítez (1) || 36,035 || 9–8
|-  style="background:#bfb;"
| 18 || April 23 || Giants || 3–2  ||  Cortés (3–0) || Fassero (1–1) || || 30,310 || 10–8
|-  style="background:#fbb;"
| 19 || April 24 || @ Phillies || 6–5 || Lidle (2–2) || Fogg (2–1) || Gordon (6) || 20,244 || 10–9
|-  style="background:#bfb;"
| 20 || April 25 || @ Phillies || 7–6 || Ramírez (1–0) || Floyd (1–2) || Fuentes (3) || 19,512 || 11–9
|-  style="background:#fbb;"
| 21 || April 26 || @ Phillies || 9–5 || Madson (2–1) || Jennings (1–1) || || 19,182 || 11–10
|-  style="background:#bfb;"
| 22 || April 27 || @ Phillies || 6–3 || Cook (2–3) || Franklin (1–2) || Fuentes (4) || 21,506 || 12–10
|-  style="background:#bfb;"
| 23 || April 28 || @ Marlins || 3–2  || Fuentes (1–0) || Herges (0–2) || Dohmann (1) || 10,419 || 13–10
|-  style="background:#bfb;"
| 24 || April 29 || @ Marlins || 8–7 || Asencio (1–0) || Messenger (0–1) || Fuentes (5) || 15,405 || 14–10
|-  style="background:#bfb;"
| 25 || April 30 || @ Marlins || 3–1 || Kim (1–0) || Mitre (1–3) || Mesa (1) || 13,259 || 15–10

|-  style="background:#fbb;"
| 26 || May 1 || @ Braves || 2–0 || Hudson (2–2) || Jennings (1–2) || || 19,212 || 15–11
|-  style="background:#fbb;"
| 27 || May 2 || @ Braves || 5–4 || Cormier (2–1) || King (1–2) || Reitsma (6) || 22,813 || 15–12
|-  style="background:#bfb;"
| 28 || May 3 || Reds || 3–0 || Francis (1–2) || Claussen (2–3) || Fuentes (6) || 18,214 || 16–12
|-  style="background:#fbb;"
| 29 || May 4 || Reds || 7–1 || Harang (5–1) || Fogg (2–2) || || 18,204 || 16–13
|-  style="background:#bfb;"
| 30 || May 5 || Astros || 6–4 || Ramírez (2–0) || Lidge (0–2) || || 20,327 || 17–13
|-  style="background:#bfb;"
| 31 || May 6 || Astros || 5–0 || Jennings (2–2) || Rodríguez (4–1) || || 26,358 || 18–13
|-  style="background:#bfb;"
| 32 || May 7 || Astros || 5–3 || Cook (3–3) || Nieve (1–1) || Fuentes (7) || 30,270 || 19–13
|-  style="background:#bfb;"
| 33 || May 8 || @ Cardinals || 6–2 || Francis (2–2) || Marquis (3–4) || Fuentes (8) || 39,007 || 20–13
|-  style="background:#fbb;"
| 34 || May 9 || @ Cardinals || 4–2 || Wainwright (1–0) || Mesa (0–1) || Isringhausen (9) || 40,375 || 20–14
|-  style="background:#fbb;"
| 35 || May 10 || @ Cardinals || 7–4 || Suppan (4–2) || Kim (1–1) || Isringhausen (10) || 39,108 || 20–15
|-  style="background:#fbb;"
| 36 || May 12 || @ Astros || 12–2 || Gallo (1–0) || Jennings (2–3) || || 39,617 || 20–16
|-  style="background:#bfb;"
| 37 || May 13 || @ Astros || 2–1 || Cook (4–3) || Oswalt (5–3) || Fuentes (9) || 35,852 || 21–16
|-  style="background:#fbb;"
| 38 || May 14 || @ Astros || 3–0 || Pettitte (3–4) || Francis (2–3) || || 37,614 || 21–17
|-  style="background:#fbb;"
| 39 || May 15 || Dodgers || 5–4 || Tomko (5–1) || Ramírez (2–1) || Saito (1) || 20,208 || 21–18
|-  style="background:#bfb;"
| 40 || May 16 || Dodgers || 5–1 || Kim (2–1) || Lowe (1–3) || || 23,192 || 22–18
|-  style="background:#fbb;"
| 41 || May 17 || Dodgers || 3–2 || Penny (4–1) || Jennings (2–4) || Báez (9) || 30,296 || 22–19
|-  style="background:#bfb;"
| 42 || May 19 || Blue Jays || 8–3 || Cook (5–3) || Towers (1–8) || || 26,011 || 23–19
|-  style="background:#bfb;"
| 43 || May 20 || Blue Jays || 5–1 || Francis (3–3) || Taubenheim (0–1) || || 26,212 || 24–19
|-  style="background:#bfb;"
| 44 || May 21 || Blue Jays || 5–3 || Fogg (3–2) || Lilly (4–4) || Fuentes (10) || 30,291 || 25–19
|-  style="background:#fbb;"
| 45 || May 22 || @ Dodgers || 6–1 || Seo (2–2) || Kim (2–2) || || 33,652 || 25–20
|-  style="background:#fbb;"
| 46 || May 23 || @ Dodgers || 8–1 || Penny (5–1) || Jennings (2–5) || || 40,228 || 25–21
|-  style="background:#fbb;"
| 47 || May 24 || @ Dodgers || 7–1 || Sele (3–0) || Cook (5–4) || || 39,299 || 25–22
|-  style="background:#fbb;"
| 48 || May 26 || @ Giants || 9–0 || Schmidt (4–2) || Francis (3–4) || || 40,923 || 25–23
|-  style="background:#fbb;"
| 49 || May 27 || @ Giants || 4–1 || Cain (3–5) || Fogg (3–3) || Benítez (3) || 40,350 || 25–24
|-  style="background:#bfb;"
| 50 || May 28 || @ Giants || 6–3 || Kim (3–2) || Wright (5–4) || Fuentes (11) || 42,935 || 26–24
|-  style="background:#bfb;"
| 51 || May 29 || @ Padres || 5–0 || Jennings (3–5) || Thompson (2–1) || || 27,904 || 27–24
|-  style="background:#fbb;"
| 52 || May 30 || @ Padres || 2–0 || Young (4–3) || Cook (5–5) || Hoffman (10) || 23,698 || 27–25
|-  style="background:#fbb;"
| 53 || May 31 || @ Padres || 3–2 || Hensley (4–3) || Francis (3–5) || Hoffman (11) || 24,607 || 27–26

|-  style="background:#fbb;"
| 54 || June 2 || Marlins || 4–2 || Willis (2–6) || Fogg (3–4) || Kensing (1) || 26,112 || 27–27
|-  style="background:#fbb;"
| 55 || June 3 || Marlins || 13–0 || Nolasco (4–2) || Kim (3–3) || || 23,831 || 27–28
|-  style="background:#fbb;"
| 56 || June 4 || Marlins || 4–3 || Olsen (4–3) || Jennings (3–6) || Borowski (7) || 21,125 || 27–29
|-  style="background:#fbb;"
| 57 || June 5 || Pirates || 5–2 || Snell (6–3) || Cook (5–6) || Gonzalez (8) || 20,152 || 27–30
|-  style="background:#bfb;"
| 58 || June 6 || Pirates || 5–4 || Francis (4–5) || Maholm (2–5) || Fuentes (12) || 20,277 || 28–30
|-  style="background:#bfb;"
| 59 || June 7 || Pirates || 16–9 || Dohmann (1–0) || Pérez (2–7) || || 21,509 || 29–30
|-  style="background:#fbb;"
| 60 || June 9 || Dodgers || 3–0 || Penny (7–1) || Kim (3–4) || Saito (3) || 30,455 || 29–31
|-  style="background:#bfb;"
| 61 || June 10 || Dodgers || 12–9 || Jennings (4–6) || Tomko (5–5) || Fuentes (13) || 35,557 || 30–31
|-  style="background:#fbb;"
| 62 || June 11 || Dodgers || 6–5 || Báez (4–3) || Fuentes (1–1) || Saito (4) || 29,221 || 30–32
|-  style="background:#bfb;"
| 63 || June 12 || @ Nationals || 4–3 || Francis (5–5) || Ortiz (5–5) || Fuentes (14) || 20,633 || 31–32
|-  style="background:#bfb;"
| 64 || June 13 || @ Nationals || 9–2 || Fogg (4–4) || O'Connor (3–4) || || 21,689 || 32–32
|-  style="background:#bfb;"
| 65 || June 14 || @ Nationals || 14–8 || Martin (1–0) || Bray (1–1) || || 24,273 || 33–32
|-  style="background:#bfb;"
| 66 || June 15 || @ Nationals || 8–1 || Jennings (5–6) || Hernández (5–7) || || 22,793 || 34–32
|-  style="background:#fbb;"
| 67 || June 16 || @ Cardinals || 8–1 || Marquis (9–4) || Cook (5–7) || || 45,736 || 34–33
|-  style="background:#fbb;"
| 68 || June 17 || @ Cardinals || 6–5 || Suppan (6–4) || Francis (5–6) || Isringhausen (23) || 45,968 || 34–34
|-  style="background:#fbb;"
| 69 || June 18 || @ Cardinals || 4–1 || Carpenter (6–3) || Fogg (4–5) || Isringhausen (24) || 45,647 || 34–35
|-  style="background:#bfb;"
| 70 || June 19 || Athletics || 7–0 || Kim (4–4) || Haren (6–6) || || 21,964 || 35–35
|-  style="background:#bfb;"
| 71 || June 20 || Athletics || 6–0 || Jennings (6–6) || Loaiza (2–4) || || 21,753 || 36–35
|-  style="background:#fbb;"
| 72 || June 21 || Athletics || 3–2  || Calero (1–1) || King (1–3) || || 26,489 || 36–36
|-  style="background:#fbb;"
| 73 || June 23 || Rangers || 8–6 || Koronka (6–4) || Francis (5–7) || Otsuka (15) || 28,360 || 36–37
|-  style="background:#bfb;"
| 74 || June 24 || Rangers || 11–6 || Fogg (5–5) || Tejeda (1–3) || || 31,439 || 37–37
|-  style="background:#bfb;"
| 75 || June 25 || Rangers || 3–0 || Kim (5–4) || Padilla (6–5) || Fuentes (15) || 28,313 || 38–37
|-  style="background:#fbb;"
| 76 || June 26 || @ Angels || 5–4 || Lackey (5–5) || Mesa (0–2) || Rodríguez (19) || 43,781 || 38–38
|-  style="background:#bfb;"
| 77 || June 27 || @ Angels || 12–4 || Cook (6–7) || Weaver (3–10) || || 39,341 || 39–38
|-  style="background:#bfb;"
| 78 || June 28 || @ Angels || 6–2 || Ramírez (3–1) || Shields (4–5) || || 38,153 || 40–38
|-  style="background:#bfb;"
| 79 || June 30 || @ Mariners || 2–0 || Fogg (6–5) || Moyer (5–7) || || 31,612 || 41–38

|-  style="background:#fbb;"
| 80 || July 1 || @ Mariners || 8–7 || Mateo (5–1) || Cortés (3–1) || Putz (15) || 33,638 || 41–39
|-  style="background:#bfb;"
| 81 || July 2 || @ Mariners || 4–3  || Fuentes (2–1) || Mateo (5–2) || King (1) || 31,709 || 42–39
|-  style="background:#fbb;"
| 82 || July 3 || Giants || 9–6 || Accardo (1–2) || Ramírez (3–2) || Benítez (8) || 48,364 || 42–40
|-  style="background:#bfb;"
| 83 || July 4 || Giants || 6–1 || Francis (6–7) || Schmidt (6–4) || || 48,078 || 43–40
|-  style="background:#bfb;"
| 84 || July 5 || Giants || 5–3 || Fogg (7–5) || Wright (5–8) || Fuentes (16) || 23,485 || 44–40
|-  style="background:#fbb;"
| 85 || July 7 || Diamondbacks || 4–3 || Medders (2–2) || Kim (5–5) || Julio (8) || 26,313 || 44–41
|-  style="background:#fbb;"
| 86 || July 8 || Diamondbacks || 8–7 || Vizcaíno (3–3) || Fuentes (2–2) || Julio (9) || 22,874 || 44–42
|-  style="background:#fbb;"
| 87 || July 9 || Diamondbacks || 8–5 || González (1–2) || Dohmann (1–1) || Julio (10) || 22,210 || 44–43
|-  style="background:#fbb;"
| 88 || July 13 || @ Reds || 9–7 || Milton (6–4) || Francis (6–8) || Guardado (6) || 20,660 || 44–44
|-  style="background:#fbb;"
| 89 || July 14 || @ Reds || 3–1 || Harang (10–6) || Jennings (6–7) || Guardado (7) || 22,497 || 44–45
|-  style="background:#fbb;"
| 90 || July 15 || @ Reds || 3–2 || Bray (2–1) || Fuentes (2–3) || || 35,396 || 44–46
|-  style="background:#fbb;"
| 91 || July 16 || @ Reds || 6–4 || Coffey (4–4) || Mesa (0–3) || Guardado (8) || 27,043 || 44–47
|-  style="background:#fbb;"
| 92 || July 17 || @ Pirates || 3–1 || Grabow (2–1) || Kim (5–6) || Capps (1) || 18,835 || 44–48
|-  style="background:#bfb;"
| 93 || July 18 || @ Pirates || 13–4 || Francis (7–8) || Gorzelanny (0–2) || || 20,086 || 45–48
|-  style="background:#fbb;"
| 94 || July 19 || @ Pirates || 6–5 || Duke (7–8) || Jennings (6–8) || Gonzalez (15) || 19,881 || 45–49
|-  style="background:#fbb;"
| 95 || July 21 || @ Diamondbacks || 6–2 || Vargas (8–6) || Cook (6–8) || || 23,068 || 45–50
|-  style="background:#fbb;"
| 96 || July 22 || @ Diamondbacks || 4–3 || Medders (4–2) || Mesa (0–4) || Julio (12) || 28,745 || 45–51
|-  style="background:#bfb;"
| 97 || July 23 || @ Diamondbacks || 9–7 || Martin (2–0) || Julio (1–4) || Fuentes (17) || 29,310 || 46–51
|-  style="background:#bfb;"
| 98 || July 24 || Cardinals || 7–0 || Francis (8–8) || Reyes (2–4) || || 28,830 || 47–51
|-  style="background:#fbb;"
| 99 || July 25 || Cardinals || 1–0 || Carpenter (10–4) || Jennings (6–9) || Isringhausen (28) || 31,673 || 47–52
|-  style="background:#fbb;"
| 100 || July 26 || Cardinals || 6–1 || Suppan (8–5) || Cook (6–9) || || 32,872 || 47–53
|-  style="background:#bfb;"
| 101 || July 27 || Padres || 9–8  || Fuentes (3–3) || Williamson (2–4) || || 24,260 || 48–53
|-  style="background:#bfb;"
| 102 || July 28 || Padres || 3–1 || Kim (6–6) || Hensley (6–8) || Fuentes (18) || 28,790 || 49–53
|-  style="background:#fbb;"
| 103 || July 29 || Padres || 4–2 || Young (9–4) || Francis (8–9) || Hoffman (28) || 43,433 || 49–54
|-  style="background:#bfb;"
| 104 || July 30 || Padres || 3–1 || Jennings (7–9) || Thompson (3–3) || Fuentes (19) || 25,790 || 50–54
|-  style="background:#bfb;"
| 105 || July 31 || Brewers || 4–2 || Cook (7–9) || Capuano (10–7) || Fuentes (20) || 23,189 || 51–54

|-  style="background:#fbb;"
| 106 || August 1 || Brewers || 1–0 || Bush (7–8) || Fogg (7–6) || Cordero (8) || 22,082 || 51–55
|-  style="background:#bfb;"
| 107 || August 2 || Brewers || 8–2 || Kim (7–6) || Ohka (3–2) || || 24,034 || 52–55
|-  style="background:#bfb;"
| 108 || August 4 || @ Giants || 5–2 || Francis (9–9) || Morris (8–9) || Fuentes (21) || 38,033 || 53–55
|-  style="background:#bfb;"
| 109 || August 5 || @ Giants || 2–1 || Affeldt (5–6) || Hennessey (4–2) || Fuentes (22) || 39,014 || 54–55
|-  style="background:#fbb;"
| 110 || August 6 || @ Giants || 6–2 || Cain (8–8) || Cook (7–10) || || 39,288 || 54–56
|-  style="background:#fbb;"
| 111 || August 7 || @ Dodgers || 7–2 || Penny (12–5) || Fogg (7–7) || || 44,593 || 54–57
|-  style="background:#fbb;"
| 112 || August 8 || @ Dodgers || 4–2 || Tomko (7–6) || Kim (7–7) || Saito (12) || 50,210 || 54–58
|-  style="background:#bfb;"
| 113 || August 9 || @ Dodgers || 3–1 || Affeldt (6–6) || Lowe (9–8) || Fuentes (23) || 46,643 || 55–58
|-  style="background:#fbb;"
| 114 || August 10 || @ Dodgers || 4–3 || Saito (4–2) || Mesa (0–5) || || 48,699 || 55–59
|-  style="background:#bfb;"
| 115 || August 11 || Cubs || 10–2 || Cook (8–10) || Hill (2–5) || || 35,744 || 56–59
|-  style="background:#bfb;"
| 116 || August 12 || Cubs || 8–4 || Fogg (8–7) || Guzmán (0–3) || || 43,485 || 57–59
|-  style="background:#fbb;"
| 117 || August 13 || Cubs || 8–7 || Novoa (2–0) || Corpas (0–1) || Dempster (23) || 35,408 || 57–60
|-  style="background:#bfb;"
| 118 || August 14 || Diamondbacks || 4–3 || Affeldt (7–6) || Peña (3–2) || || 21,365 || 58–60
|-  style="background:#fbb;"
| 119 || August 15 || Diamondbacks || 2–1  || Medders (5–2) || Ramírez (3–3) || || 22,076 || 58–61
|-  style="background:#fbb;"
| 120 || August 16 || Diamondbacks || 9–5 || Hernández (10–9) || Cook (8–11) || || 23,415 || 58–62
|-  style="background:#bfb;"
| 121 || August 17 || Diamondbacks || 8–4 || Fogg (9–7) || Webb (13–5) || || 23,390 || 59–62
|-  style="background:#fbb;"
| 122 || August 18 || @ Mets || 6–3 || Trachsel (12–5) || Kim (7–8) || Wagner (29) || 35,325 || 59–63
|-  style="background:#fbb;"
| 123 || August 19 || @ Mets || 7–4 || Heilman (2–4) || Francis (9–10) || Wagner (30) || 55,085 || 59–64
|-  style="background:#fbb;"
| 124 || August 20 || @ Mets || 2–0 || Hernández (9–9) || Jennings (7–10) || Wagner (31) || 40,654 || 59–65
|-  style="background:#fbb;"
| 125 || August 22 || @ Brewers || 4–1 || Capuano (11–8) || Cook (8–12) || Cordero (16) || 25,158 || 59–66
|-  style="background:#fbb;"
| 126 || August 23 || @ Brewers || 7–1 || Sheets (4–5) || Kim (7–9) || || 35,569 || 59–67
|-  style="background:#fbb;"
| 127 || August 24 || @ Brewers || 12–6 || Ohka (4–3) || Fogg (9–8) || || 35,484 || 59–68
|-  style="background:#bfb;"
| 128 || August 25 || Padres || 13–5 || Francis (10–10) || Thompson (3–5) || || 24,182 || 60–68
|-  style="background:#fbb;"
| 129 || August 26 || Padres || 5–2 || Hensley (8–10) || Jennings (7–11) || Hoffman (34) || 29,748 || 60–69
|-  style="background:#bfb;"
| 130 || August 27 || Padres || 6–3 || Cook (9–12) || Peavy (7–13) || || 26,308 || 61–69
|-  style="background:#fbb;"
| 131 || August 29 || Mets || 10–5 || Trachsel (14–5) || Kim (7–10) || || 23,454 || 61–70
|-  style="background:#fbb;"
| 132 || August 30 || Mets || 11–3 || Williams (4–3) || Fogg (9–9) || || 22,945 || 61–71
|-  style="background:#bfb;"
| 133 || August 31 || Mets || 8–4 || Francis (11–10) || Pérez (2–11) || || 23,273 || 62–71

|-  style="background:#fbb;"
| 134 || September 1 || @ Dodgers || 6–3 || Lowe (13–8) || Jennings (7–12) || Saito (17) || 49,601 || 62–72
|-  style="background:#fbb;"
| 135 || September 2 || @ Dodgers || 14–5 || Penny (15–7) || Cook (9–13) || || 48,984 || 62–73
|-  style="background:#bfb;"
| 136 || September 3 || @ Dodgers || 12–5 || Kim (8–10) || Sele (7–6) || || 44,895 || 63–73
|-  style="background:#fbb;"
| 137 || September 4 || @ Padres || 7–5 || Seánez (3–1) || Fuentes (3–4) || || 35,722 || 63–74
|-  style="background:#fbb;"
| 138 || September 5 || @ Padres || 5–4 || Meredith (4–1) || Francis (11–11) || Hoffman (37) || 26,456 || 63–75
|-  style="background:#fbb;"
| 139 || September 6 || @ Padres || 2–0  || Meredith (5–1) || Field (0–1) || || 27,968 || 63–76
|-  style="background:#bfb;"
| 140 || September 7 || Nationals || 10–5 || Corpas (1–1) || Wagner (3–3) || || 18,617 || 64–76
|-  style="background:#bfb;"
| 141 || September 8 || Nationals || 11–8 || Field (1–1) || Rauch (3–4) || Fuentes (24) || 22,214 || 65–76
|-  style="background:#bfb;"
| 142 || September 9 || Nationals || 9–5 || Venafro (1–0) || Oritz (10–13) || || 22,735 || 66–76
|-  style="background:#bfb;"
| 143 || September 10 || Nationals || 13–9 || Mesa (1–5) || Schroder (0–2) || Fuentes (25) || 18,647 || 67–76
|-  style="background:#fbb;"
| 144 || September 12 || @ Giants || 10–6 || Correia (2–0) || Bautista (0–3) || || 33,416 || 67–77
|-  style="background:#bfb;"
| 145 || September 13 || @ Giants || 9–8 || Jennings (8–12) || Lowry (7–9) || Fuentes (26) || 34,847 || 68–77
|-  style="background:#fbb;"
| 146 || September 14 || @ Giants || 5–0 || Cain (13–9) || Cook (9–14) || || 35,167 || 68–78
|-  style="background:#fbb;"
| 147 || September 15 || @ Diamondbacks || 5–1 || Webb (16–6) || Kim (8–11) || || 22,017 || 68–79
|-  style="background:#fbb;"
| 148 || September 16 || @ Diamondbacks || 7–6  || Julio (2–4) || Affeldt (7–7) || || 27,822 || 68–80
|-  style="background:#bfb;"
| 149 || September 17 || @ Diamondbacks || 6–1 || Francis (12–11) || Batista (10–7) || || 28,056 || 69–80
|-  style="background:#bfb;"
| 150 || September 18 || Giants || 20–8 || Hampson (1–0) || Lowry (7–10) || || 18,346 || 70–80
|-  style="background:#bfb;"
| 151 || September 19 || Giants || 12–4 || Jennings (9–12) || Cain (13–10) || Affeldt (1) || 20,373 || 71–80
|-  style="background:#fbb;"
| 152 || September 20 || Giants || 7–4 || Wilson (2–3) || Corpas (1–2) || Stanton (8) || 19,324 || 71–81
|-  style="background:#fbb;"
| 153 || September 21 || Braves || 6–3 || Smoltz (14–9) || Kim (8–12) || Wickman (31) || 18,499 || 71–82
|-  style="background:#bfb;"
| 154 || September 22 || Braves || 6–4 || Fogg (10–9) || Hudson (12–12) || Fuentes (27) || 33,260 || 72–82
|-  style="background:#bfb;"
| 155 || September 23 || Braves || 10–9 || Francis (13–11) || Davies (3–6) || Fuentes (28) || 24,300 || 73–82
|-  style="background:#bfb;"
| 156 || September 24 || Braves || 9–8 || Affeldt (8–7) || Yates (2–5) || Fuentes (29) || 30,216 || 74–82
|-  style="background:#fbb;"
| 157 || September 26 || Dodgers || 11–4 || Maddux (14–14) || Jennings (9–13) || || 20,133 || 74–83
|-  style="background:#fbb;"
| 158 || September 27 || Dodgers || 6–4 || Lowe (16–8) || Cook (9–15) || Saito (22) || 18,858 || 74–84
|-  style="background:#fbb;"
| 159 || September 28 || Dodgers || 19–11 || Hendrickson (6–15) || King (1–4) || || 21,154 || 74–85
|-  style="background:#bfb;"
| 160 || September 29 || @ Cubs || 5–2 || Fogg (11–9) || Zambrano (16–7) || Fuentes (30) || 33,721 || 75–85
|-  style="background:#bfb;"
| 161 || September 30 || @ Cubs || 11–9  || Ramírez (4–3) || Ryu (0–1) || || 39,483 || 76–85

|-  style="background:#fbb;"
| 162 || October 1 || @ Cubs || 8–5 || Aardsma (3–0) || Affeldt (8–8) || || 39,609 || 76–86

Player stats

Batting

Starters by position 
Note: Pos = Position; G = Games played; AB = At bats; H = Hits; Avg. = Batting average; HR = Home runs; RBI = Runs batted in

Other batters 
Note: G = Games played; AB = At bats; H = Hits; Avg. = Batting average; HR = Home runs; RBI = Runs batted in

Pitching

Starting pitchers 
Note: G = Games pitched; IP = Innings pitched; W = Wins; L = Losses; ERA = Earned run average; SO = Strikeouts

Other pitchers 
Note: G = Games pitched; IP = Innings pitched; W = Wins; L = Losses; ERA = Earned run average; SO = Strikeouts

Relief pitchers 
Note: G = Games pitched; W = Wins; L = Losses; SV = Saves; ERA = Earned run average; SO = Strikeouts

Awards and accomplishments
 Colorado Rockies DHL Hometown Hero: Larry Walker

Farm system

References

2006 Colorado Rockies at Baseball Reference
2006 Colorado Rockies team page at www.baseball-almanac.com

Colorado Rockies seasons
Colorado Rockies season
Colorado Rockies
2000s in Denver